Marnix Leonard Alexander van Rij (born 25 October 1960) is a Dutch politician. As of 10 January 2022, Van Rij is State of Secretary for Finance in the fourth Rutte cabinet

From 1999 until 2001, he was party chair of the Christian Democratic Appeal (CDA). Since 1 January 1998 he has been a partner at the professional services firm Ernst & Young. From2015 to 2019, he also served as a Senator, a part-time position in the Netherlands. As a Senator, his portfolio consisted of tax affairs, among other themes. On 15 February 2020, van Rij was appointed as the Island Governor of Sint-Eustatius. After this, Van Rij was interim party chairman for  CDA from 3 April until 11 December 2021.

References
  Parlement.com biography
2. https://www.rijksoverheid.nl/actueel/nieuws/2020/01/24/benoeming-nieuwe-regeringscommissaris-en-plaatsvervanger-sint-eustatius

1960 births
Living people
Aldermen of Wassenaar
Businesspeople from Rotterdam
Christian Democratic Appeal politicians
Dutch jurists
Dutch management consultants
Members of the Senate (Netherlands)
Municipal councillors of Wassenaar
Chairmen of the Christian Democratic Appeal
Politicians from Rotterdam
Protestant Church Christians from the Netherlands
Lieutenant Governors of Sint Eustatius